IDAGIO is a streaming service specializing in classical music with both free and paid tiers. The company is based in Berlin, Germany.

History 
IDAGIO was founded in 2015 by Till Janczukowicz, a former artist manager, and Christoph Lange, who previously founded the German streaming company Simfy. Janczukowicz has said that his aim is "to offer the ultimate streaming service for classical music worldwide." IDAGIO officially started its streaming app for iOS at the Salzburg Festival in 2015.

IDAGIO added the Sony Classical catalogue in December 2017 and the Deutsche Grammophon catalogue (comprising also the Decca, Philips and ECM labels) in January 2018. In April 2018 it announced a partnership with Warner Classics, bringing the entire Warner Classics and Erato catalogues to the platform.

In September 2018, following a €10 million funding round, the service launched in North America. Labels from the Outhere Music Group (including Alpha, Phi, Aeon and Ricercar) were added to the service in April 2019.

In November 2019, IDAGIO was named one of Time Magazine's 2019 Best Inventions.

Exclusive content 
Several recordings have been available exclusively for streaming on IDAGIO.

In January 2020, IDAGIO reached an exclusive streaming agreement with violinist Maxim Vengerov.

References 

Music streaming services
Companies based in Berlin
German companies established in 2015